Raksha Santram Saroniya is an Indian politician. She was elected to the Madhya Pradesh Legislative Assembly from Bhander. She was an elected member of the Madhya Pradesh Legislative Assembly as a member of the Indian National Congress. During 2020 Madhya Pradesh political crisis, She supported senior Congress leader Jyotiraditya Scindia and was one of the 22 MLAs who resigned and later joined Bharatiya Janata Party.

References

Madhya Pradesh MLAs 2018–2023
Bharatiya Janata Party politicians from Madhya Pradesh
Living people
People from Datia district
Indian National Congress politicians from Madhya Pradesh
Year of birth missing (living people)